Josef Grunner (10 June 1904 – 27 November 1984) was a German politician of the Social Democratic Party (SPD) and member of the German Bundestag.

Life 
As a Berlin member of parliament, Grunner was a member of the German Bundestag from 11 June 1957, when he succeeded the late Louise Schroeder, until his resignation on 21 June 1957.

Literature

References

1904 births
1984 deaths
Members of the Bundestag for Berlin
Members of the Bundestag 1953–1957
Members of the Bundestag for the Social Democratic Party of Germany